"8dayz" (read as "8 Days") is the official debut single of YouTube sensation and Birth of a Great Star contestant Megan Lee, featuring boy band Beast's Yong Jun-hyung. The song was written by Megan Lee and singer Kim Tae-woo with music by German songwriters Andreas Bärtels and Rüdger Schramm from Jam Factory. The single was released in Korean and English versions on May 15, 2014.

Music video
The video begins with Lee waking up in the morning, but then being too lazy to get up from her bed. Some hands later manage to wake her up. Then there are scenes from inside a room (Megan singing with a masked back-up band) and a garden (Megan Lee only). Megan later danced to the tune of the song with back-up dancers from two rooms of the house.

Yong Jun-hyung appeared in the night party and rapped with Megan Lee singing in the background. In the end, a picture of Megan and Junhyung with the dancers is seen inside a picture frame, while Megan was sleeping. The clock then announced the time: 12:00 (midnight).

In the English version, the Junhyung scene is not included.

The Korean version premiered on Mnet TV on April 30. The English version premiered on the same channel on May 5.

Track listing
Digital download
"8dayz" (featuring Yong Jun-hyung of BEAST) - 
"8dayz" (English version, solo) - 

Digital download (iTunes)
"8dayz" (featuring Yong Jun-hyung of BEAST) - 
"8dayz" (instrumental) -

Personnel
Musicians
 Megan Lee - main vocals, banjo, English lyrics
 Yong Jun-hyung - rap vocals, Korean rap lyrics

Additional personnel
 Andreas Bärtels (Jam Factory) - composition, English lyrics
 Rüdger Schramm (Jam Factory) - composition
 Kim Tae-woo - Korean lyrics, producer

Charts

Release history

References

2014 singles
2014 songs
Korean-language songs
English-language South Korean songs